Marianne Gedigian is an American flutist and teacher. She holds a Butler Professorship as Professor of Flute at the University of Texas at Austin Butler School of Music. She has formerly held positions as acting principal flute of the Boston Symphony Orchestra, Boston Pops Orchestra, Pittsburgh Symphony, and as principal flute of the Boston Pops Esplanade Orchestra. Gedigian has worked with composer John Williams and can be heard on the film scores for Schindler's List and Saving Private Ryan. Her teachers include Clement Barone, Doriot Anthony Dwyer, and Leone Buyse. She has performed solo recitals on four continents in the US, Australia, Japan and England. Gedigian is a Haynes flute artist.

Biography 
Gedigian was born and raised near Detroit, Michigan. In early high school, Gedigian began studying with Detroit Symphony Orchestra piccoloist Clement Barone. She studied flute with Doriot Anthony Dwyer while receiving a degree from the New England Conservatory, and pursued later studies with Leone Buyse.

Gedigian won 1993 Young Artist Competition at the National Flute Association Convention, and placed second in 1989. She was a member and acting principal flute of the Boston Symphony Orchestra and the Boston Pops Orchestra for over a decade, and was featured on programs including the Evening at Pops and nationally televised Fourth of July broadcasts. She collaborated with composer John Williams and can be heard on the film scores for Saving Private Ryan and Schindler's List. She was the acting Principal Flute with the Pittsburgh Symphony during the 2000-2001 season, under Maestro Mariss Jansons. She frequently transcribes works for the flute, including the Khachaturian Violin Concerto, which she performed with the Armenian Philharmonic.

She is active as a teacher and clinician, having given masterclasses to the New York Flute Club, various festivals and at the National Flute Association Convention. In addition to her professorship at the Butler School of Music, she has held positions at Boston University and The Boston Conservatory, and served on the summer faculty at the Brevard Music Center, Round Top International Institute, and Tanglewood Music Center. She is active as a chamber musician, holding positions with the Walden Chamber Players in Boston and touring throughout the US, and formerly was a part of the Dorian Wind Quintet. She frequently collaborates with fellow Butler School professor and pianist Rick Rowley. The duo has released two CDs.

Discography 
 Voice of the Flute (2009); Gedigian, flute and Rick Rowley, piano (CD Baby)
 Revolution (2010); Gedigian, flute and Rick Rowley, piano (Longhorn Music)

Personal life 
Gedigian is married to Charles Villarrubia and has one daughter.

References

External links 
 Interview with Gedigian in New York Flute Club newsletter
 Marianne Gedigian at the Butler School of Music - University of Texas at Austin

Living people
American classical flautists
Women flautists
Musicians from Detroit
New England Conservatory alumni
20th-century American musicians
20th-century classical musicians
20th-century American women musicians
21st-century American musicians
21st-century classical musicians
21st-century American women musicians
University of Texas at Austin faculty
Boston University faculty
Boston Conservatory at Berklee faculty
Classical musicians from Michigan
Women music educators
Year of birth missing (living people)
American women academics
20th-century flautists
21st-century flautists